Conley is a census-designated place (CDP) in Clayton County, Georgia, United States. In Atlanta’s Southeast Corner. Just 7.98 Miles South from Downtown. The population was 6,228 at the 2010 census. It is part of the Atlanta Metropolitan Area.

Geography

Conley is located along the northern border of Clayton County at  (33.640142, -84.342255). It is bordered by the city of Forest Park to the south and west, the city of Atlanta to the northwest, and by unincorporated land in DeKalb County to the north. The eastern edge of the CDP is formed by U.S. Route 23 (Moreland Avenue). Fort Gillem is to the south in Forest Park.

Demographics

2020 census

As of the 2020 United States census, there were 6,680 people, 2,016 households, and 1,266 families residing in the CDP.

2000 census
As of the census of 2000, there were 6,188 people, 1,968 households, and 1,505 families residing in the CDP. The racial makeup of the CDP was 34.34% White, 52.86% African American, 0.31% Native American, 4.75% Asian, 0.26% Pacific Islander, 6.06% from other races, and 1.42% from two or more races. Hispanic or Latino of any race were 10.46% of the population.

There were 1,968 households, out of which 42.9% had children under the age of 18 living with them, 41.2% were married couples living together, 28.2% had a female householder with no husband present, and 23.5% were non-families. 17.7% of all households were made up of individuals, and 4.9% had someone living alone who was 65 years of age or older.  The average household size was 3.14 and the average family size was 3.49.

In the CDP, the population was spread out, with 32.9% under the age of 18, 10.1% from 18 to 24, 31.9% from 25 to 44, 18.9% from 45 to 64, and 6.3% who were 65 years of age or older.  The median age was 29 years. For every 100 females, there were 94.0 males.  For every 100 females age 18 and over, there were 92.5 males.

The median income for a household in the CDP was $31,478, and the median income for a family was $32,922. Males had a median income of $24,817 versus $24,289 for females. The per capita income for the CDP was $11,629.  About 16.7% of families and 20.3% of the population were below the poverty line, including 30.2% of those under age 18 and 13.6% of those age 65 or over.

Economy
A large number of trucking companies operate facilities in Conley, including less-than-truckload carriers, parts suppliers and mechanics. Companies with terminals or other facilities in or near Conley include Old Dominion Freight Line, R+L Carriers, FedEx Freight, Saia, ABF Freight System, XTRA Lease, Estes Express Lines, Schneider National, Southeastern Freight Lines, Roehl Transport, Star Leasing, B.A.H. Express, C.R. England, CRST International, Tennessee Commercial Warehouse, Salson Logistics, Arka Express and Central Freight Lines. The majority of these trucking companies are located along US 23/GA 42.

The Hickory Ridge Landfill is located in Conley. The capped landfill is now a solar energy project.

References

Census-designated places in Clayton County, Georgia
Census-designated places in Georgia (U.S. state)